The Third Republic of the Democratic Republic of the Congo is a unitary state with a five-level hierarchy of types of administrative division.  There are nine different types of country subdivision in a new hierarchy with no new types but with two from the previous one abolished.

Under the Third Republic, established in 2006, the number of provinces has gone from ten to twenty-five.  By fits and starts the number of towns that have been, or are in the process of being, upgraded to cities has also increased greatly.

Reforms to devolve powers to the provinces were completed in 2006, but devolution to more local levels have again been delayed when elections scheduled for 2019 were not held.  Traditional authority continues to play a significant role in governance with traditional leaders leading many of the subdivisions at the lower levels.

Territorial organization 
The hierarchy of types of administrative division in the Congo, as set down in organic law, is as follows:

 Province
 Territory 
 Sector or Chiefdom 
 Grouping 
 Village
 Commune
 Quarter 
 ⋯
 Embedded Grouping 
 Village
 City 
 Commune
 Quarter 
 ⋯
 Embedded Grouping 
 Village

So a province is divided into territories and cities; a territory into sectors, chiefdoms, and communes; a sector or chiefdom into groupings; and so on.

Remarks 
 Kinshasa, as the capital city, has the status of a province with the subdivisions of a city.  It is often referred to as a city-province.
 The district and the cité, previously a division of a province and territory respectively, have been abolished.  The cité has been replaced by the commune.
 In the Congo a commune can now be an urban subdivision of a city, a country town, or in some cases a mostly rural area attached to a city.
 An older term, collectivity (fr. collectivité), is sometimes used for convenience to refer to both a sector and a chiefdom.
 Some collectivities are not a contiguous area of land but are made up instead of more than one unconnected area.
 The grouping (of villages) and, at a higher level, the chiefdom are subdivisions led by customary leaders of traditional polities.
 An embedded grouping is a grouping that has been absorbed into a commune.
 A quarter has divisions but these are not set down by organic law.
 There are uninhabited areas that are not part of any subdivision below a territory.

New subdivisions

New provinces 
The Constitution, as before, divides the country into the city of Kinshasa and the provinces, however, it increased the number of provinces from ten to twenty-five. This was put into effect in 2015, when the six largest provinces were split into twenty-one new provinces. Together with the four unsplit provinces—Bas-Congo (renamed Kongo Central), Maniema, Nord-Kivu, and Sud-Kivu—they make up the twenty-five provinces listed in Article 2 of the Constitution.

Under the old organization the six former provinces were divided into districts and cities. The districts were further divided into territories. Each new province was created from the territories of one or two districts, adding any enclosed cities and—if necessary—making the new capital a city.  The following table gives the complete details.  So for instance, Lommami province resulted from the split of the former Kasaï-Oriental province; created from the territories of the former Kabinda district, the city of Mwene-Ditu, and by making the town of Kabinda the capital city.

New cities and communes 
In June 2013 a batch of prime ministerial decrees was issued giving city and commune status to, and setting the boundaries for, a large number of former cités and other populated places.  According to the government's 2014 statistical yearbook the Congo would go from 21 cities and 227 cités in 2008 to 99 cities and 289 territorial communes in the reorganization.  However, in July 2015 the implementation of many of the decrees' articles were suspended following the failure in the National Assembly of an electoral bill based on the boundaries in the decrees.

In order to pass a modified bill allocating seats for upcoming local elections, it was decided to suspend those articles that were contentious and to revert the affected communities to their 2006 administrative configurations.  The articles granting city status to new provincial capitals—Boende, Bunia, Buta, Gemena, Inongo, Isiro, Kabinda, Kalemie, Kamina, Kenge, Lisala, and Lusambo—were not suspended and neither were those granting commune status to the administrative centers of the territories.

Ultimately the planned for local elections never occurred, but the suspensions were not lifted until mid-2018 just months before the general election.  The National Alliance of Traditional Authorities of the Congo protested this reinstatement as diminishing traditional authority and as a threat to national security.  In addition to reinstating the articles the government decided that disputes over boundaries would be resolved by an ad hoc committee and that the setting up of cities and communes would be prioritized with 18 cities in the initial phase.  

In 2019 mayors for the new cities of Uvira, Baraka, Kamituga, and  Kasumbalesa were appointed.  The setting up of a city administration and those of its subdivisions can take years given the lack of local resources.  For instance the town of Buta gained city status when it became a provincial capital in 2015, had its first mayor appointed in 2018, and by June 2019 its four communes were still not operational.

Number of subdivisions 

Table 2 is based on data compiled by the Independent National Electoral Commission (CENI) as part of organizing the election cycle of 2018.  The count of cities only includes those currently represented in the national and provincial assemblies and not those that became cities after the organization of the elections.  Thus, for example, the new city of Uvira is not counted as a city but as a commune in the table.  This of course also effects the counts of city subdivisions such as communes and quarters.

Governance 

The Constitution of 2006 and ensuing organic laws brought reforms to the governance of the subdivisions which are not yet complete.  Table 3 sketches the envisioned governance by subdivision type and its current status.

Uncompleted devolution 
These reforms devolved powers to the provinces and, more modestly, to the cities and the subdivisions at the third administrative level. They all were to have both an executive body with a leader and a deliberative body which was to elect the leader. The other subdivisions remained purely administrative in nature.

The Congolese voter would have a direct say in the affairs of the province by voting in a deputy to the provincial assembly which would then go on to elect the governor.  The voter was also to have a say in more local affairs by voting in a councilperson to the local council which was then, except in a chiefdom, to go on to elect the local leader. If the voter lived in a provincial city they were also to have a more indirect say, again through the local council, in the composition of the city government.

Similar elections for local councils have yet to occur. Thus, the effected subdivisions have no deliberative body and their leaders, as provided by law, are unelected and appointed from above. In this way a city mayor is much like a territory administrator. For now the Congolese voter does not have a say in local affairs.

Local council elections were scheduled to occur on 22 September 2019.  In April of that year the League of Women Voters for the Elections met with the electoral commission and condemned the delay in starting candidate registration for the local elections.  In June, the League of Voters stressed the importance of these elections and asked President Tshisekedi to intervene to get the process going. In August, a petition with two million signatures demanding that the elections be held was filed at the presidential palace. The signatures were collected within two months by the Catholic and Protestant Churches.  At the end of October the outgoing electoral commission presented their final report to the National Assembly. At this time their rapporteur said that organizing the local elections required a workforce of 650,000 and the allocation of considerable funds by the government.  Finally, in December President Tshisekedi declared that the elections would be held sometime in 2020. This did not happen.

However, in February 2022 the new electoral commission published a roadmap for the next election cycle that would have the local council elections occur in December 2023 along with the elections for the president, the National Assembly, and the provincial assemblies.  But, when the electoral calendar was published in November 2022, the elections for sector and chiefdom council were pushed back to 11 July 2024 leaving only the commune elections to be run on 20 December 2023.

Traditional authority 
Traditional leaders have a significant role in governing the subdivisions.  At the first administrative level, 8% of all provincial deputies are co-opted traditional leaders.  At the third and forth levels they are the leaders of 25% and 70% of the subdivisions respectively.  In 2018, 64% of the electorate lived in a grouping without counting those in embedded groupings.

Traditional authority is recognized by Article 207 of the Constitution and a law defining the legal status of traditional leaders was passed in 2015.  In addition to being official leaders of their administrative divisions, these leaders exercise customary authority – which can involve traditional advisory councils – in a way that is not contrary to the Constitution, the law, public order and decency.  The leaders are also obligated to be apolitical.

Although selected by local structures according to custom, traditional leaders can only exercise their authority if they are officially recognized and invested by the government.  Failure of the government to do so can cause great resentment.  In 2013 such a dispute over the leadership of a grouping eventually led, through an escalation of conflicts in 2016, to the Kamwina Nsapu rebellion.

Related divisions

Electoral districts 

Except for the four National Assembly districts in Kinshasa, all electoral districts in Table 4 are administrative divisions.  The Carter Center expert mission report for the 2018 elections criticizes the use of these divisions for national and provincial elections as not meeting international standards for uniform allocation of voters per constituency.  As example they contrast 27,228 voters per National Assembly seat in the city of Inongo vs. 128,699 in the territory of Lomela.

See also 
Provinces of the Democratic Republic of the Congo
Territories of the Democratic Republic of the Congo
List of cities in the Democratic Republic of the Congo
Chiefdoms and sectors of the Democratic Republic of the Congo
Constituencies in the National Assembly
 Former districts of the Democratic Republic of the Congo

Notes and references

Cited Works 

 

 

 

 

 

 

 

 

 

 

 

 

 

 

 

 

 

 

 

 

 

 

 

 

 

 

 

 

 

 
Congo
Congo, Democratic Republic of